Ian Thomas McGrath (born July 17, 1996) is an American professional soccer player who plays as a midfielder for Chattanooga FC in the National Independent Soccer Association.

Early and personal life
McGrath was born in Crestwood, Illinois, the middle of three brothers, and he attended Lincoln-Way West High School.

Career
After playing at youth level for the Chicago Fire, McGrath played college soccer for the Evansville Purple Aces between 2014 and 2017. and scored 26 goals in 71 appearances.

McGrath spent time in the National Premier Soccer League with FC Buffalo in the 2016 season, and in the USL Championship with Nashville SC in the 2018 season. Whilst at Nashville, McGrath spent time on loan at Inter Nashville FC, also in the National Premier Soccer League, scoring one in 4 appearances.

In January 2019, McGrath signed for Scottish Championship club Queen of the South, after a successful two week trial. McGrath debuted on February 2, 2019 in a 3–0 league defeat versus the Bairns at the Falkirk Stadium.

In August 2019, McGrath signed for National Independent Soccer Association club Philadelphia Fury for the league's inaugural season.

In September 2019, McGrath signed for USL Championship club OKC Energy FC.

In February 2020, McGrath signed for Chattanooga FC ahead of its inaugural season in the National Independent Soccer Association. On February 29, he scored the first professional goal in the team's history against Oakland Roots SC.

Career statistics

References

1996 births
Living people
American soccer players
Chicago Fire FC players
Evansville Purple Aces men's soccer players
FC Buffalo players
Nashville SC (2018–19) players
Inter Nashville FC players
Queen of the South F.C. players
National Premier Soccer League players
Scottish Professional Football League players
Association football midfielders
American expatriate soccer players
American expatriates in Scotland
Expatriate footballers in Scotland
Philadelphia Fury players
OKC Energy FC players
Chattanooga FC players
National Independent Soccer Association players